FC Eindhoven is a Dutch football club based in Eindhoven, North Brabant. They currently play in the Eerste Divisie (second tier of Dutch football), and are one of two professional clubs which are based in the city of Eindhoven, the other one being PSV Eindhoven.

FC Eindhoven play their home games at Jan Louwers Stadion, on the southern part of the city. The club's official colours are blue and white, hence their nickname Blauw-Witten (The Blue-Whites).

History
The club was founded on 16 November 1909 as EVV Eindhoven. A couple of Gentleman had seen that the clubs in the North area called the Randstad were growing and felt there was a need for a new team in Eindhoven too. Decided was to found a new club under the name E.V.V. short for Eindhovense Voetbal Vereniging. Club colours were blue and white, the blue came from the crest of the city Eindhoven at that time. E.V.V. start to play in the Brabantse Voetbalbond, a regional league, but a couple of years after they start to play in the NVB, the National League. In 1921 E.V.V. fuses with Gestel (local team) and changes its name to E.V.V. Eindhoven. At the end of the 30s Eindhoven has his first bit of success as they got hold of the Dutch Cup, the KNVB Beker (1937). In 1939 E.V.V. Eindhoven is the new Champion of the 1st Division Region South and plays for the title of The Netherlands with teams like DWS, NEC, Ajax and Achilles 1894. They finish 4th.

In 1950 E.V.V. Eindhoven has their first Dutch international in the name of Noud van Melis. Frans Tebak and Dick Snoek were to follow in his footsteps soon. In 1954, Eindhoven were the last Dutch league champions before the introduction of the professional league. After turning professional in 1954, the club played in the Eredivisie until 1957, when Eindhoven were relegated to the Eerste Divisie. In 1969 they were even relegated to the Tweede Divisie. Two years later, the club secured promotion back to the Eerste Divisie, and in 1975, Eindhoven were promoted to the Eredivisie. In 1977, Eindhoven were relegated back to the Eerste Divisie, where it has remained ever since. In 1997 E.V.V. Eindhoven left the professional scene and is once again an amateur club. A new professional club SBV Eindhoven (Stichting Betaald Voetbal Eindhoven) was founded, this name was in 2002 changed to FC Eindhoven.

In the 2009–2010 season FC Eindhoven qualified for playoffs to advance to the Eredivisie. Eindhoven advanced past the first round defeating AGOVV Apeldoorn 4–2 goal aggregate. Eindhoven was pitted against possible relegation from Eredivisie club Willem II and were narrowly defeated 3–2 aggregate. So they will remain in the Eerste Divisie. In 2011/2012 FC Eindhoven had a fantastic season and finished 3rd, despite Ernest Faber leaving FC Eindhoven as manager to join Dick Advocaat at PSV to be his assistant in March 2012. The club lost 3–0 to Helmond Sport over two legs, 1–0 in the first and 2–0 in the second, in Round 2 of the promotion playoffs.

Erwin Koeman, the replacement of Ernest Faber, left in the summer of 2012 and was replaced by John Lammers. Under Lammers the 12–13 season finished in a disappointing 16th spot, only above two sides whose points totals had been set at zero due to bankruptcy. The 13–14 season was a big improvement with the club finishing 6th and qualifying for the promotion play-offs. There they encountered Sparta Rotterdam to whom they lost to 3–1 on aggregate.

Rivalries
FC Eindhoven's former biggest rivalry is with neighbours PSV Eindhoven, against whom they contest the Lichtstad Derby ('City of Light Derby'). However, the clubs have not faced each other in league competition since the 1976–77 season. FC Eindhoven used to be a bigger club than PSV in the period between 1930 and 1955. PSV was a club for the workers of Phillips and seen as a club for the privileged while FC Eindhoven was seen as the people's club. In 2004, FC Eindhoven contracted a co-operation deal with neighbours PSV Eindhoven, meaning the possibility of swapping youth players between the two clubs.

Nowadays, Helmond Sport are seen as the biggest rivals. The clubs are about 15 km apart and have been playing in the same league for years.

Honours
 Eredivisie
Winner: 1954
 KNVB Cup
 Winner: 1937
 Promoted to Eredivisie
 Promotion: 1975
 Promoted to Eerste Divisie
 Promotion: 1971

Results

Below is a table with FC Eindhoven's domestic results since the introduction of professional football in 1956.

Current squad

Out on loan

Former players

  Geoffrey Prommayon
  Joos van Barneveld
  Jonathan Waterberg
  Samuel Greven

Club Officials

Former managers

References

External links

 Official website

 
fc
Football clubs in the Netherlands
Association football clubs established in 1909
1909 establishments in the Netherlands